Alfara may refer to:

 Alfara de la Baronia, village in Camp de Morvedre, Valencian Community, Spain
 Alfara de Carles, village in Baix Ebre, Catalonia
 Alfara del Patriarca, town in Horta Nord, Valencian Community, Spain